Boulderclough is a small village in the Borough of Calderdale in West Yorkshire, England.

The village contains a chapel. The village public house closed some years ago; the nearest pub is at Sowerby Castle Hill half-a-mile to the south-east. There are footpaths, and a river that runs by a small woodland area.

Villages in West Yorkshire